The 1936 LSU Tigers football team represented Louisiana State University (LSU) in the 1936 college football season.

LSU won their second consecutive Southeastern Conference championship and earned their second straight trip to the Sugar Bowl in New Orleans. The defense allowed only 33 points the entire season, which still ranks fourth in school history for the fewest points allowed by a Tiger defense.

The team was rated No. 1 by the contemporary Houlgate System and presented with the Foreman & Clark national championship trophy.

Schedule

Auburn
The Tigers made their way to Birmingham's Legion Field to battle rival Auburn. One of the highlights of the game constituted LSU RB Cotton Milner's 90-yard touchdown run in the Tigers 19–7 victory over Auburn. The run ranks fourth on LSU's list of longest rushing touchdowns in school history.

Southwestern Louisiana
The Tigers' game at home against Southwestern Louisiana saw the Tigers score 52 points in a half, which ranks second in school history, and 93 points in a single game, which is the most points scored by LSU in a game.

References

LSU
LSU Tigers football seasons
Southeastern Conference football champion seasons
LSU Tigers football